Roger Prinzen is a German football manager.

Coaching career

Early career
Prinzen was head coach of Balzers and was assistant coach at Vaduz in Liechtenstein.

1. FC Nürnberg

Prinzen is normally the U–23 coach for 1. FC Nürnberg. He took over the U–23 team on 21 June 2013. However, during the 2013–14 season, he took over on an interim basis on 7 October 2013 when Michael Wiesinger was sacked and on 23 April 2014 when Gertjan Verbeek was sacked. Rainer Zietsch took over the U–23 team on 19 October 2013 while Prinzen was coaching the first team. Valérien Ismaël succeeded Prinzen on 5 June 2014.

Coaching record

References

German football managers
German expatriate football managers
Bundesliga managers
FC Balzers managers
1. FC Nürnberg managers
Living people
Year of birth missing (living people)